Elections were held in Lanark County, Ontario on October 24, 2022 in conjunction with municipal elections across the province.

Lanark County Council
Lanark County Council consists of two members from each constituent municipality.

Beckwith
The following were the results for reeve and deputy reeve of Beckwith.

Reeve
Incumbent reeve Richard Kidd was re-elected by acclamation. He has been reeve since 2000.

Deputy reeve

Carleton Place
The following were the results for mayor and deputy mayor of Carleton Place.

Mayor

Deputy mayor

Drummond/North Elmsley
Steve Fournier was re-elected as reeve of Drummond/North Elmsley by acclamation.

Reeve

Lanark Highlands
The following were the results for reeve and deputy reeve of Lanark Highlands.

Reeve

Deputy reeve

Mississippi Mills
The following were the results for mayor and deputy mayor of Mississippi Mills.

Mayor

Deputy mayor

Montague
The following were the results for reeve and deputy reeve of Montague.

Reeve

Deputy reeve

Perth
The following were the results for mayor and deputy mayor of Perth.

Mayor
Mayor John Fenik was challenged by town councillor Judy Brown and businessperson Stephanie Drummond.

Deputy mayor

Tay Valley
The following were the results for reeve and deputy reeve of Tay Valley.

Reeve

Deputy reeve

References

Lanark
Lanark County